German submarine U-1023 was a Type VIIC/41 U-boat of Nazi Germany's Kriegsmarine. She was laid down on 20 May 1943 by Blohm & Voss in Hamburg, Germany, and commissioned on 15 June 1944 with Oberleutnant Wolfgang Strenger in command. After the war she was sunk in Operation Deadlight.

Design
German Type VIIC/41 submarines were preceded by the heavier Type VIIC submarines. U-1023 had a displacement of  when at the surface and  while submerged. She had two shafts and two  propellers.

U-1023 was fitted with five  torpedo tubes (four fitted at the bow and one at the stern), fourteen torpedoes, one  SK C/35 naval gun, (220 rounds), one  Flak M42 and two  C/30 anti-aircraft guns. The boat had a complement of between forty-four and sixty.

Armament

FLAK weaponry
U-1023 was mounted with a single 3.7 cm Flakzwilling M43U gun on the rare LM 43U mount. The LM 43U mount was the final design of mount used on U-boats and is only known to be installed on U-boats (and ). The 3.7 cm Flak M42U was the marine version of the 3.7 cm Flak used by the Kriegsmarine on Type VII and Type IX U-boats. U-1023 was mounted with two 2cm Flak C38 in a M 43U Zwilling mount with short folding shield on the upper Wintergarten. The M 43U mount was used on a number of U-boats (and ).

Service history
U-1023 was ordered by the Kriegsmarine on 13 June 1942. She was laid down about one year later at Blohm & Voss, Hamburg on 20 May 1943. Almost a year later, U-1023 was launched from Hamburg on 3 May 1944. She was formally commissioned later that year on 15 June. U-1023 carried 5 ×  torpedo tubes (4 located in the bow, 1 in the stern) and had one  deck gun with 220 rounds. She could also carry 14 G7e torpedoes or 26 TMA mines and had a crew of 44–52 men. She was one of the U-boats that used the Schnorchel underwater breathing apparatus.

After her redesignation as a front-line U-boat, U-1023 left port on her first and only patrol. By that time, she had moved from Kiel to her later location in Bergen via a stopover in Horten Naval Base. After leaving on 25 March 1945 for her first patrol, U-1023 intercepted and attacked Riverton, a  British steam merchant on 23 April. She was damaged and beached off St. Ives Bay. Later, on 7 May 1945, the last day of the war in Europe, U-1023 found the 335 tons Norwegian minesweeper , which was sunk with 22 dead.

Fate
U-1023 was surrendered at Weymouth, England on 10 May 1945. After the war she was paraded up the west coast of the UK visiting a number of ports including Plymouth, Brixham, Falmouth, Bristol, Swansea, Liverpool, Holyhead, Manchester, Fleetwood, Belfast, Glasgow, Greenock, Rothsay, Oban. Several hundred thousand visitors were given a tour of the boat during this time. U-1023 was then used in Operation Deadlight and sunk by the Allies on 7 January 1946.

Summary of raiding history

See also
 German U-boat bases in occupied Norway
 Actions of 7–8 May 1945

References

Notes

Citations

Bibliography

External links

German Type VIIC/41 submarines
U-boats commissioned in 1944
World War II submarines of Germany
1944 ships
Ships built in Hamburg
Operation Deadlight
Maritime incidents in 1946